The Steps is a 2015 Canadian comedy film directed by Andrew Currie. It was screened in the Contemporary World Cinema section of the 2015 Toronto International Film Festival.

Plot
Jeff (Jason Ritter), a Wall Street power broker going through a slump in business and relationship, and Marla (Emmanuelle Chriqui), a party-loving Princeton graduate, are siblings. Their father Ed (James Brolin) is a wealthy old man who has remarried and moved to Lake Country in Ontario, Canada. The siblings resentfully arrive with their Dad's lake house to meet his new wife, an ex-waitress, Sherry (Christine Lahti) and her children: redneck David (Benjamin Arthur) and his wife Tammy (Kate Corbett), failed musician Keith (Steven McCarthy) and academically inclined Sam (Vinay Virmani). Ed and Sherry announce their plans to adopt a child in an attempt to gel the new family together. The movie attempts to portray a comic clash between two cultures and two families which quickly descends into chaos.

Cast

 Emmanuelle Chriqui as Marla
 James Brolin as Ed
 Jason Ritter as Jeff
 Christine Lahti as Sherry
 Naomi Snieckus as Ellen
 Kate Corbett as Tammy
 Rainbow Francks as Dean
 Steven McCarthy as Keith
 Vinay Virmani as Sam
 Benjamin Arthur as David

References

External links
 

2015 films
2015 comedy films
Canadian comedy films
English-language Canadian films
Films directed by Andrew Currie
2010s English-language films
2010s Canadian films